Kleiner Dambecker See is a lake in Nordwestmecklenburg, Mecklenburg-Vorpommern, Germany. At an elevation of 52.4 m, its surface area is 0.42 km².

Lakes of Mecklenburg-Western Pomerania
Nature reserves in Mecklenburg-Western Pomerania